Langley School may refer to:

 Langley School, Loddon, Norfolk, England
 Langley School, Solihull, West Midlands, England
 Langley Grammar School, Berkshire, England
Langley Secondary School, British Columbia, Canada

See also 
 Langley (disambiguation)
 Langley Academy, Slough, Berkshire, UK
 Langley High School (disambiguation)
 School District 35 Langley, British Columbia, Canada
 The Langley Schools Music Project, a recording project involving students from the district